Molly Beth Beene Malcolm (born April 26, 1955) is an American politician and former school teacher. She is a former chairperson of the Texas Democratic Party and a current member of the Texarkana College Board of Trustees based in Texarkana.

Originally a Republican and having worked for Clayton Williams′ 1990 campaign for governor of Texas against Ann W. Richards, Malcolm became a Democrat in 1992. The Texas Democratic Party elected her as chairperson in 1998 and to two additional terms in 2000 and in 2002. The first woman to hold this position, she resigned on October 25, 2003.

She is a former secretary of the Texarkana College Board of Trustees and the subject of a complaint to the Southern Association of Colleges and Schools (SACS).

Awards
On October 25, 2010, Malcolm was named the 2010 Winnsboro High School distinguished alumna in Winnsboro in east Texas.

Notes

External links
Official web site
Board of Trustees (Texarkana College)

1955 births
Living people
Texas Democrats
People from Texarkana, Texas
Texas Republicans
State political party chairs of Texas
Schoolteachers from Texas
American women educators
21st-century American women